MM7 may refer to:

 MM7 (MMS), a type of Multimedia Messaging Service interface
 MM7 register, a CPU register used by the MMX extension
 Mega Man 7, a 1995 SNES game in the Mega Man video game series
 Might and Magic VII: For Blood and Honor, a 1999 PC role-playing video game
 mM7, mM7, m/M7 or m(M7), chord symbols for a minor major seventh chord